Assam Tourism Development Corporation or ATDC is a state owned corporation of Assam, India. It deals with tourism services and development as a part of the Assam Tourism Department along with the Directorate of Tourism. The State Govt. of Assam set up the corporation on 9 June 1988. The ATDC is headquartered at Guwahati and has district offices across Assam. Its official slogan is "Awesome Assam."

History of tourism in Assam
Once, this northeastern state of India was known as Pragjyotishpura, then Kamrupa. During Ahom rule the land was called Axom, which foreigners pronounced "Assam". Assam was ruled by many kingdoms from ancient times. In 1826, British took over Assam and made it a separate state. From ancient times, tourists have come to this land. The Chinese traveler Xuanzang visited Kamrupa during Bhaskarvarman in the 7th century.

In 1958, the Department of Tourism was established. In 1962, an information office opened in Kaziranga, and in 1965, an information office opened in Sivasagar.

In 1987 (during the seventh Five Year Plan), the first ever tourism policy of Assam was notified and subsequently ATDC was formed with a paid up capital of 24 lakh. In the same year the state government declared tourism as an industry.

In the mid-70s, Assam tourism started properties near Kaziranga and other places such as Aranya, Banani, Banashree, MV and Jolporee. After the creation of ATDC, some of them were handed over to ATDC to operate. From the beginning, ATDC created many tourist lodges, yatriniwas, parks, and wayside amenities with the brand name of "Prashaanti". In 2009, a "tourist arrival cum reception center" was opened in Guwahati, which is presently known as "Asom Paryatan Bhawan". In 2012, ATDC started a luxury cruise, MV Mahabaahu, in a joint venture.

In 1995 the Restricted Area Permit (RAP) from Assam was withdrawn which had been imposed in 1962 after Chinese attack.

Properties
Assam tourism has more than 50 properties including lodges, wayside amenities, restaurants, parks, rope ways, amusement parks, and cruises in locations across Assam. Out of these, the Directorate of Tourism runs eight lodges. ATDC operates directly seven lodges, and other properties are on lease to private parties.

Properties near Kaziranga National Park of Golaghat and Nagaon districts include:
 Aranya Tourist Lodge
 Kaziranga Tourist Lodge (Banani, Bonoshree, Kunjabon under DOT)
 Jupurighar camping site
 Jonaki Kareng (reception center)
 Prashaanti Cottage
 Rhinorica (wayside amenity)
 GL Resort, Jakhalabanda (wayside amenity)
 Triptir Ehaj, Amoni (wayside amenity)
 Tanz Water Sports (Kaliabhumora Recreational Park)
 Down Town Resort
 Samaguri Lake Tourism Project

Prashaanti Lodges and tourist complexes of other places include:
 Barpeta
 Barpeta Road
 Bhalukpong
 Digboi
 Golaghat
 Goramur, Majuli
 Guwahati
 Kamakhya
 Nalbari
 Pobitara
 Silchar
 Sivasagar (DOT)
 Tezpur
 Tinsukia

More than 15 parks and restaurants across Assam run under ATDC on lease.

Red River Tours & Travels is its travel wing, which operates customized and conducted tours, such as Kaziranga tours, city tours, and pilgrimage tours.

See also
 Tourism in Assam
 Tourism in Kaziranga National Park

External links
 Assam in Wikivoyage
 Assam Tourism, official website
 Assam Tourism Development Corporation Limited

References

Tourism in Assam
State tourism development corporations of India
1988 establishments in Assam
Government agencies established in 1988